Senayan Station is a rapid transit station on the North-South Line of the Jakarta MRT in Jakarta, Indonesia. Located on Jl. Jendral Sudirman, it is the first underground station (when heading north towards ) on the MRT. The station is located close to the Ratu Plaza Shopping Center, within walking distance of the malls of Senayan City and Plaza Senayan.

Location 
The southernmost underground station on the MRT, Senayan station is located on Jl. Jendral Sudirman in Kebayoran Baru, South Jakarta. Nearby are the shopping malls of Ratu Plaza, Senayan City, and Plaza Senayan. The station is located close to the Senayan Roundabout and Youth Advancement Monument Statue, as well as Jl. Pattimura and Jl. Senopati.

History 

Station layout

Gallery

References

External links 

  Senayan Station on the Jakarta MRT website

South Jakarta
Jakarta MRT stations
Railway stations opened in 2019